The Koara people, more recently spelt Kuwarra, are an Aboriginal Australian people living in the Kuwarra Western Desert region of Western Australia. In its fullest extent it would constitute portions of land in the Pilbara, Mid West, and Goldfields-Esperance regions of Western Australia.

Most of the present-day Kuwarra may be found in Meekatharra, Cue and Wiluna areas, which are in the Mid West region.

Country
The northern limits ran to Gidgee, Mount Sir Samuel and Lake Darlot. The eastern frontier lay around Mount Zephyr. Their western lands were contiguous with those of the Watjarri and Badimaya, and on the east and northeast by those of the traditional Ngaanyatjarra, Martu people and Mantjiltjarra.

History of contact
Estimates of the pre-contact Kuwarra population range from 250 to several hundred. By 1980, aboriginals with Kuwarra descent numbered a mere 60 people. The dispersion and detribalization of aboriginal tribes in this area followed in the wake of three successive waves of immigration, beginning with the Coolgardie and Kalgoorlie gold rushes, and concluding with the discovery of uranium deposits and the development of Laverton and Agnew, in the 1960s and 70s.

The indigenous people living in and around the Yeelirrie district had their continuity and transmission of cultural across generations severely compromised by the government practice of seizing their half-caste children to be raised elsewhere, so that the latter would 'grow up' unaffected by their traditional identities. One technique devised by people like the Kuwarra who had half-caste children in their family camps was to rub the offspring with charcoal ash from burnt sandalwood, to make them pass as of pure tribal descent. At times, if a pastoralist vouchsafed that they worked on his property, they could escape the meshes of the round-up law. Such forced removals persisted down to the late 1970s.

Those who managed to find employment on pastoral stations were often taken on as indentured labourers and were paid a pittance. A law was passed forbidding any white, other than station owners, to approach groups of aboriginals at a distance under
five chains(100 metres. To escape bondage under such conditions, some endeavoured, when WW2 broke out, to enlist in the army, but pastoralists could overturn this by arguing they were needed on the property. Their nomadic movements were drastically disrupted, again, when a 1940 law ruled that no native person could cross over below the 20th parallel of latitude unless he could obtain a signed medical certificate and written permission from the government minister.

Kuwarra could, like other Westralian aboriginals, obtain citizenship according to a law passed in 1944, which was on the books until its repeal in 1971. However, obtaining such citizenship carried with it a provision, that the new 'Australian' ex-aboriginal person solemnly undertake to no longer associate with aboriginals, with the sole exception of members of their immediate families.

Alternative names
 Go:ara, Goara
 Guwara
 Konindja (exonym used by eastern tribes)
 Konindjara Waula'' ("northerners" for the Waljen)

Notes

Citations

Sources

Aboriginal peoples of Western Australia